Kurd is a masculine German given name and a Kurdish and Baloch/Brahui surname.

Notable people

Given name 
 Kurd Lasswitz (1848–1910), a German author
 Kurd Kisshauer (1886–1958), German astronomer
 Kurd Maverick, German DJ
 Kurd Mehmed Pasha (died  1605), Ottoman statesman
 Kurd Peters (1914–1957), German officer
 Kurd von Mosengeil (1884–1906), German physicist
 Kurd von Schlözer (1822–1894), German historian and diplomat
 Kurd von Schöning (1789–1859), Prussian army officer and historian

Surname 
 Abdul Aziz Kurd, an early 20th-century Baloch nationalist politician
 Abdulla Kurd (1977–2011), Kurdish militant fighting in Chechnya
 Ahmad Kurd (born 1949), politician from the Gaza Strip
 Ali Ahmad Kurd (fl. 2007), Pakistani lawyer
 Keça Kurd (1948), Kurdish writer and translator
 Javed Kurd (born 1967), Pakistani-Norwegian music producer.
 Said Pasha Kurd (1834–1907), Ottoman statesman

German masculine given names